Isoflavanes are a class of isoflavonoids, which are themselves types of polyphenolic compounds. They have the 3-phenylchroman (isoflavan, CAS number: 4737-26-2, molecular formula: C15H14O, exact mass: 210.1044646 u) backbone.

Examples
 Equol

Sources

Lonchocarpus laxiflorus contains two isoflavanes: lonchocarpane and laxiflorane.

See also
 Isoflavonoid